The North American blizzard of 2008 was a winter storm that struck most of southern and eastern North America from March 6 to March 10, 2008. The storm was most notable for a major winter storm event from Arkansas to Quebec. It also produced severe weather across the east coast of the United States with heavy rain, damaging winds and tornadoes, causing locally significant damage. The hardest hit areas by the wintry weather were from the Ohio Valley to southern Quebec where up to a half a meter of snow fell locally including the major cities of Columbus, Ohio, Cleveland, Ohio, and Ottawa, Ontario. For many areas across portions of the central United States, Ontario and Quebec, it was the worst winter storm in the past several years. The blizzard and its aftermath caused at least 17 deaths across four US states and three Canadian provinces, while hundreds others were injured mostly in weather-related accidents and tornadoes.

Meteorological synopsis and event

March 6

During the day, a low pressure system developed across Texas and rain gradually turned into snow in parts of Oklahoma and northern Texas giving locally a few inches of snow particularly just east of Oklahoma City. Across southern Texas, an EF1 tornado touched down near the Corpus Christi region.

March 7

From Texas north and east through Ohio, heavy snow fell. Sherman, Texas received , while Collinsville, TX got . Cincinnati, Ohio received  which broke the daily snowfall record for March 7.

In Florida, several tornadoes hit the Jacksonville area, as well as in parts of Georgia. The Storm Prediction Center said one person was injured and two were killed. In total, 17 tornadoes were reported during the outbreak across the two states including duplicated reports and at least thirteen were confirmed including five EF1's and three EF2's.

Tornadoes confirmed

March 8–9

As of 9 am, Cincinnati had received  of snow. Louisville, Kentucky reported  of snow, while Columbus, Ohio got . Several Ohio locations reported thundersnow early Saturday morning.  Parts of Indiana, Kentucky and Ohio were under Blizzard Warnings.

For portions of Middle Tennessee, it was the worst snowstorm since 2003. Humphreys and Perry Counties along the Tennessee River both exceeded  of snow while portions of the Nashville area received ; its biggest snowfall since March 19, 1996, where  fell. A large area of Tennessee affected by the winter storm were hit by several strong and deadly tornadoes just over one month earlier on February 5.

Heavy snow fell on some areas that already had close-to-record-breaking amounts of snow for that winter.

Parts of Nova Scotia, southern New Brunswick, Newfoundland and Labrador, Prince Edward Island and most of the Interstate 95 corridor along the Eastern Seaboard of the United States from the Carolinas to Maine also saw heavy rain while strong winds also accompanied the precipitation particularly along the eastern US where the winds were also accompanied by damaging wind causing localized damage to mostly trees, power lines and some structures including in the Philadelphia and Washington D.C. regions. About  of rain fell over Saint John, New Brunswick causing localized street and basement flooding. The system departed the continent and over the Atlantic Ocean on March 10 and crossed just west of the British Isles causing strong winds across Ireland, the United Kingdom and parts of western Europe.

Impact

Incidents
At Port Columbus International Airport, an airplane skidded off the runway after landing, but nobody was injured. In Cambridge, Ontario, 6 people were injured after a smoking canopy collapsed due to the snow. In Quebec, due to the heavy weight of the snow and/or the damaging wind gusts, several structures collapsed or were damaged in the Mauricie, Centre-du-Québec and Quebec City regions as well as in eastern Ontario although there were no injuries.  A few days later during the aftermath of the snowstorm in Morin-Heights, Quebec, the heavy snow cover was responsible for a roof collapse at a factory that killed 3 people. A fourth person died on March 16 from a collapsed house in Shawinigan, north of Trois-Rivières, while saving three family members.

Several schools in the Montreal area, mostly from its largest school board the Commission scolaire de Montréal, were closed later in the week in order to clear snow from the roofs due to concerns about possible collapses of the structures forcing the evacuation of thousands of elementary school students into nearby arenas, community centers or churches. In Chelsea, Quebec, two elementary schools were also evacuated after a custodian worker discovered cracks on a ceiling and a malfunctioned sliding door possibly due to the weight of the snow. Students were moved into a village church. The four high schools of the Commission Scolaire des Draveurs, the Cégep de l'Outaouais and the Université du Québec en Outaouais in Gatineau as well as Rockland District High School in Rockland and Sir Wilfrid Laurier Secondary School in Ottawa were shut down for a few days for precautionary reasons and for roof snow removal operations. Numerous other structures were also evacuated throughout the  week including parts of the Pratt & Whitney plant in Longueuil for similar reasons.  Three other homes, one in the Westboro area of Ottawa, one in La Pêche and the other in the Beauce region, also had their roofs collapsed or split because of the snow. At Ottawa's Dow's Lake, an historical landmark used by army and reservists was damaged beyond repair forcing it to be torn down.

Event/school cancellations
The University of Cincinnati's men's basketball team were unable to depart from Cincinnati from its game against Connecticut which forced its postponement. Many sporting events across the Buckeye State were canceled. The University of Louisville also canceled classes on Saturday as did Ryerson University, and several colleges in Toronto also on Saturday and Quebec City's Université Laval on Sunday. All major school districts in the Columbus area were closed until Monday as did several schools in Quebec while school in Ontario were closed because of the annual March week break.

Power outages
About 87,000 Hydro-Québec customers lost power during the peak of the storm with the Quebec City region being the hardest hit area in Quebec, where winds were gusting in excess of 100 km/h with the highest being 133 km/h. 4 000 customers in New Brunswick, 2500 in Prince Edward Island and 5000 in Nova Scotia were without power because of the winds and heavy ice. In the US, 2,000 lost power in Vermont due to the winter storm while 80,000 customers in Pennsylvania and 100,000 customers in New Jersey also lost electricity due to the severe weather and high winds.

Flight and travel disruptions

Hundreds of flights in and out of Montréal–Pierre Elliott Trudeau International Airport (400 flights) in Montreal, Pearson International Airport in Toronto and Macdonald-Cartier International Airport in Ottawa where canceled. The snowstorm hit during the end of the March school break week in Quebec and the start of it in Ontario. Due to a larger number of travelers, the storm caused a major backlog at all airports where numerous passengers were stranded and cots were also distributed to passengers at the Ottawa Airport. At the same airport, nearly 300 passengers were stranded inside two Air Cubana planes for 12 hours without water and food and disabled bathrooms before returning to the plane's initial destination in Montreal. Some of the passengers had even called for emergency vehicles due to the conditions inside the plane In addition to cancelled flights in Canada, 250 flights were canceled from Cleveland's Hopkins International Airport and was shut down for most of Saturday. About 90 percent of the flights from Port Columbus International Airport were canceled as well as several other flights elsewhere across the Midwest.

In many cities, ground transportation was also disrupted. In Ottawa, the O-Train Trillium Line was shut down for most of the day and there was significantly reduced service on local, cross-town and Transitway routes. Via Rail train service was also reduced including canceled trips during the peak of the storm on March 8 as did several off-town bus trips. The Line 3 Scarborough in the Toronto region was also completely shut down on Saturday while TTC service and GO Transit were heavily slowed down.

Road closures
In Quebec, several major highways were closed including Highway 175 between Quebec City and Saguenay as well as Autoroutes 15, 20, 30 and 40 north and east of Montreal. Several other highways in eastern Quebec including Highways 132 and 138 in the Bas-Saint-Laurent and Charlevoix regions east of Quebec City In Ontario portions of Highway 17, 400 and 401 were shut down.
In the Quebec City region, about 80 vehicles were stuck and abandoned across a secondary highway due to blowing snow and high snow drifts. East of Montreal, a 20-car pile-up west of Lavaltrie injured 10 people. Numerous other motorists while been stuck on highways were also forced to abandon their vehicles, particularly on Highways 15 and 30 north of Laval and between Brossard and Varennes

About 900 accidents were reported in Ontario provincial highways by Ontario Provincial Police including 450 across Eastern Ontario, while the Toronto Police Service reported over 1700 collisions during the weekend. In the Niagara region, a tour bus carrying 17 people tipped over into a ditch although there was no known word on any injuries in this incident. In Ohio, according to the State Highway Patrol, nearly 2 000 crashes occurred throughout the state, including one fatal one and 190 others which resulted in injuries.

Fatalities
In addition to the two roof collapse incidents that killed 4 in Quebec on March 12 and March 16, the storm was responsible for at least 4 fatalities in Ohio from heart-related issues from snow-shoveling. 5 people, including two in New York, one in Ohio, one in Tennessee and one in Ontario were killed as a result of traffic accidents. 2 people were killed by a tornado in Florida as severe weather hit many areas of the coastal states from Florida to New Jersey. An 8-year-old boy in New Brunswick was killed after the storm as a result of the collapse of a snow tunnel. In Ontario, one man died from hypothermia after being stuck in the snow two days after the storm in Stormont, Dundas and Glengary County

Gallery

See also

 Global storm activity of 2008
 Tornadoes of 2008

References

External links

 Winter storm gallery from NBC 4 Columbus
 Winter Storm Gallery (courtesy of the Ottawa Citizen)
 Storm Gallery courtesy of Cyberpresse.ca
 Storm/snow images galleries courtesy of CTV
 Storm amounts from NWS Wilimington, OH
 Storm amounts from NWS Cleveland, OH
 Snowfall map from NWS Detroit
 Storm amounts Map from NWS Louisville
 Snow map from NWS Indianapolis
 Snow and ice amounts from NWS Jackson, KY
 Storms amounts from NWS Paducah, KY
 Snow amounts from NWS Memphis
 Storm summary from NWS Birmingham
 Storm Summary from NWS Jackson, MS
 Winter storm summary from NWS Little Rock
 Snowfall map from NWS Tulsa, OK
 Environment Canada/CRIACC Summary

Blizzards in the United States
Blizzards in Canada
2008 meteorology
2008 natural disasters in the United States
F2 tornadoes
Tornadoes of 2008
Tornadoes in Florida
Tornadoes in Texas
Natural disasters in Ohio
Natural disasters in Indiana
Natural disasters in Kentucky
Natural disasters in Tennessee
Natural disasters in Arkansas
Natural disasters in New York (state)
Natural disasters in Ontario
Natural disasters in Quebec
Natural disasters in New Brunswick
Natural disasters in Texas
2008 in Florida
2008 in Quebec
2008 in Texas
Articles containing video clips
March 2008 events in North America
2008 disasters in Canada